Abu al-Hasan al-Harrani, Thabit ibn Ibrahim ibn Zahrun al-Ḥarrani (b. Raqqa 896; d. Baghdad 980), was a 10th-century physician and translator who lived and worked in Baghdad at the court of its Buyid rulers.

Biography
Not much is known about his life. He was born in Raqqa to a family of learned physicians who were originally Sabians from Harran. He was a contemporary to Ibn Butlan whom he met in Baghdad, and became one of his tutors. His works includes a medical commentary on Yahya ibn Sarafyun's book "al-Kunnash", as mentioned by Ibn Abi Usaibia. Al-Harrani died in Baghdad in 980, aged 84.

See also
:Category:Sabian scholars from the Abbasid Caliphate
Medicine in the medieval Islamic world

References

10th-century people from the Abbasid Caliphate
Physicians from the Abbasid Caliphate
People from Harran
10th-century translators
Sabian scholars from the Abbasid Caliphate